Donald William Wuerl (born November 12, 1940) is an American prelate, a cardinal, of the Catholic Church. He served as Archbishop of Washington, D.C., from 2006 to 2018. He was elevated by Pope John Paul II to serve as auxiliary bishop of Seattle (1986–1987), and bishop of Pittsburgh (1988–2006). He was named archbishop of Washington by Pope Benedict XVI and made a cardinal by him in 2010.

Wuerl is widely viewed as a theological moderate, and is well known in the church for his ability to forge consensus between different factions. Questions arose in 2018 of whether Wuerl had adequately dealt with allegations of sexual abuse under his jurisdiction. A 2018 Pennsylvania grand jury report criticized how he handled sexual abuse cases during his time in Pittsburgh. Wuerl has denied mishandling the cases. There were additional accusations that Wuerl, despite initially denying it, was aware of sexual abuse accusations against former Cardinal Theodore McCarrick, his predecessor in Washington. On October 12, 2018, Pope Francis accepted Wuerl's resignation as archbishop of Washington. Wuerl remained in charge of the archdiocese as its apostolic administrator until Pope Francis appointed his successor, Archbishop Wilton Gregory, in 2019.

Early life and education 
Donald Wuerl was born on November 12, 1940, in Pittsburgh, Pennsylvania. He was the second of four children of Francis and Mary Anna (née Schiffauer) Wuerl. He has two brothers, Wayne and Dennis, and a sister, Carol. Wuerl's father worked nights weighing freight cars for the Pennsylvania Railroad, and served in the US Navy during World War II. His mother died in 1944 and his father married Kathryn Cavanaugh in 1946. Donal Wuerl expressed an interest in becoming a priest early in life. He even held pretend masses for his brothers and sisters at home.

Wuerl received his early education at the parochial school of St. Mary of the Mount Parish in the Mount Washington neighborhood of Pittsburgh, graduating in 1958. He attended St. Gregory Seminary in Cincinnati, Ohio for his freshman and sophomore years of college from September 1958 thru May 1960. He then attended the Catholic University of America in Washington, D.C., where he was a Basselin Scholar at the Theological College, earning a Bachelor of Philosophy degree (1962) and a Master of Philosophy degree (1963) in philosophy.

Wuerl continued his studies at the Pontifical North American College in Rome. He earned a Master of Theology degree from the Pontifical Gregorian University in 1967. After ordination, Wuerl was sent to Rome for further theological study. He is an alumnus of the Pontifical University of St. Thomas Aquinas Angelicum where he obtained a Doctor of Sacred Theology degree in 1974.

While a student in Rome, Wuerl had the chance to observe the proceedings of the Second Vatican Council.

Early career 
Wuerl was ordained a priest for the Diocese of Pittsburgh on December 17, 1966 by Bishop Francis Reh. After his ordination, Wuerl was assigned as assistant pastor at St. Rosalia Parish in Pittsburgh's Greenfield neighborhood and as priest-secretary to Bishop John Wright. After Wright was elevated to cardinal in 1969, Wuerl became his full-time priest-secretary in Vatican City from 1969 until Wright's death in 1979. Because Wright was recovering from surgery and confined to a wheelchair, Wuerl, as Wright's priest-secretary, was one of three non-cardinals permitted inside the conclave that selected Karol Wojtyla as Pope John Paul II in 1978. (Wright had missed the first of the two 1978 conclaves.)

In 1976, Wuerl co-wrote with Thomas Comerford Lawler and Ronald David Lawler a catechism for adults, The Teaching of Christ. It has been reprinted several times and has been widely translated.

Wuerl served as rector at Saint Paul Seminary in Pittsburgh from 1981 to 1985. In 1982, he was appointed executive secretary to Bishop John Marshall of Burlington, Vermont, who was leading a Vatican-mandated study of US seminaries.

Episcopal career

Auxiliary Bishop of Seattle 
On December 3, 1985, Wuerl was appointed titular bishop of Rosemarkie and as an auxiliary bishop of the Archdiocese of Seattle by Pope John Paul II. Wuerl was consecrated bishop on January 6, 1986, at St. Peter's Basilica in Rome by the pope.  Wuerl and Seattle Archbishop Raymond Hunthausen worked in adjoining offices without conflict for several months until, in May 1986, they found themselves with opposing positions on proposed state legislation to prohibit discrimination on the basis of sexual orientation in employment. At that point, Hunthausen learned for the first time that Wuerl had been charged with responsibility—"complete and final decision-making power"—for several key areas normally within the Archbishop's control: worship and liturgy; the archdiocesan tribunal that considers requests for marriage annulment; seminarians, priestly formation and laicized priests; moral issues; and issues of health care and ministry to homosexuals. The division of authority only became public when Hunthausen announced it in September 1986.

While some chancery officials expressed support for Wuerl, some questioned his role and saw little impact on the archdiocese a year after his appointment. In November, Hunthausen won support for his objections to the Vatican's restrictions on his authority from the US Conference of Catholic Bishops.

In February 1987, the Vatican announced that a commission of US bishops would investigate the situation between Wuerl and Hunthausen in Seattle.  Wuerl met privately with Pope John Paul II, but declined to comment, saying "I'm just going to wait and see what the commission does". In May 1987, following a review by the commission headed by Cardinal Joseph Bernardin, Pope John Paul II restored Hunthausen's full authority as bishop, and appointed then Bishop Thomas Murphy as coadjutor bishop to assist and succeed Hunthausen.

Wuerl resigned as auxiliary bishop of the Archdiocese of Seattle on May 26, 1987. He later said the arrangement had been "unworkable". Following the restoration of Hunthausen's authority, Wuerl moved to a Pittsburgh suburb to await his next posting. Wuerl and Hunthausen eventually became friends. Wuerl said that Hunthausen taught him a great deal about the work of being a bishop.

Bishop of Pittsburgh 
Wuerl was appointed as the eleventh bishop of the Diocese of Pittsburgh on February 12, 1988 by Pope John Paul II.  He was installed on March 25, 1988.

One of the biggest problems facing the diocese was financial in nature and came from its school system. Many of the parishes were built when Catholic immigrants were swelling the population of Pittsburgh to work in the steel mills. During this era, parishes were established along ethnic lines so that parishioners could attend services in their native tongues and maintain their national traditions. This resulted in having as many as six-to-eight parishes within blocks of each other. After World War II, there was a major effort to build a school for every parish. These schools were usually staffed by nuns who were given nominal compensation. This system began to break down in the 1970s. First, the Baby Boom subsided, resulting in a reduction in student population. Second, Catholics became less likely to send their children to Catholic schools. Third, during this period there was a massive culture shift among nuns, partially in response to Vatican II, that resulted in many sisters choosing missions unrelated to education. They had to be replaced as teachers with lay staff paid market salaries.

Wuerl asked his committee of lay advisors to address the debt and deficit spending associated with Catholic education in Pittsburgh. In 1988, that committee determined that 48 of the then 333 parishes owed a total of $5.6 million. A rescue plan was made public in February 1989,  Wuerl announcing that $1.1 million owed to the diocese for insurance and the Parish Share Program would be forgiven. Indebted parishes would be given low-interest loans to refinance their other obligations. Despite the financial condition of the diocese, Wuerl decided to expand health services. He worked with hospitals and community groups to create a group home for people with AIDS. In 2003, Wuerl conducted a  $2.5 million fundraising campaign to create the Catholic Charities Free Health Care Center. The clinic primarily serves the uninsured working poor.

In 1989, Wuerl merged Sacred Heart and St. Paul Cathedral High Schools to establish Oakland Catholic High School (all three female-only schools) in the Oakland neighborhood of Pittsburgh, using the buildings of St. Paul Cathedral High School.

Wuerl launched and hosted a television program, The Teaching of Christ, in 1990. He taught at Duquesne University in Pittsburgh as a distinguished service professor. Wuerl has served as a chaplain since 1999 for the Order of Malta, Federal Association USA, attached to the Sovereign Military Order of Malta. Wuerl has also written regular columns in Columbia, the major publication of the Knights of Columbus in the United States.

Under Wuerl, the diocese had to reorganize itself in response to demographic changes, the decline of the steel industry, and the Church's weakened financial position. That process was officially completed in March 1994. Wuerl closed 73 church buildings, which included 37 churches, and reduced 331 parishes by 117 through merging. The diocese of  Pittsburgh was operating 214 parishes when Wuerl left in June 2006 to become archbishop of Washington. Wuerl's plan, The Parish Reorganization and Revitalization Project, is now used as a model for other dioceses seeking parish suppression.

Under Wuerl, the diocese began to emphasize placing women into positions of responsibility and authority. Rosemarie Cibik, a former superintendent of public instruction, became the first lay superintendent of Catholic schools in Pittsburgh. Rita Joyce, a canon and civil lawyer, became the first lay member of the diocesan marriage tribunal. Sister Margaret Hannan was appointed to the position of associate general secretary of the diocese. Later she rose to the position of chancellor, the highest canonical post that can be occupied by one who is not ordained.

Archbishop of Washington 
Pope Benedict XVI appointed Wuerl as Archbishop of the Archdiocese of Washington on May 16, 2006. He was installed on June 22 at the Basilica of the National Shrine of the Immaculate Conception and received the pallium from Pope Benedict XVI on June 29, 2006.In April 2008, Wuerl hosted the apostolic visit of Pope Benedict XVI to the District of Columbia.
Wuerl served as chairman of the board of directors of the National Catholic Educational Association from December 12, 2005, and was also chancellor of The Catholic University of America. In September 2010, the Congregation for the Doctrine of the Faith named Wuerl its delegate in the United States for facilitating the implementation of the apostolic constitution Anglicanorum coetibus.  It was issued by Pope Benedict XVI in November 2009 for Anglicans who wished to convert to Catholicism. He also heads the US Conference of Catholic Bishops (USCCB) ad hoc committee to support that implementation.

Commitment to priestly formation 
From 1994 until 2003, as Bishop of Pittsburgh, Wuerl served as a member of the board of governors of the Pontifical North American College in Rome (Chairman, 1998–1999), representing the Pennsylvania-New Jersey Region (Region III) of the USCCB. In 2008, as archbishop of Washington he was again elected to the college's board of governors, this time representing the Washington DC-Delaware-Maryland-Virginia-West Virginia region of the conference (Region IV).

Cardinal 
On November 20, 2010, Pope Benedict XVI elevated Wuerl to the College of Cardinals in a public consistory held at Saint Peter's Basilica in Vatican City. He was created Cardinal-Priest of S. Pietro in Vincoli.

Pope Benedict XVI appointed Wuerl to the following posts:

 Member of the Congregation for the Clergy and the Pontifical Council for Promoting Christian Unity (December 2010); 
 Relator-general (recording secretary) of the 2012 World Synod of Bishops meeting on the New Evangelization (October 24, 2011); 
 Member of the Pontifical Council for Culture for a five-year renewable term (December 10, 2011); 
 Member of the Congregation for the Doctrine of the Faith (April 21, 2012);

Pope Francis appointed Wuerl to the  Congregation for Bishops (December 16, 2013).

In 2011, Wuerl faced widespread criticism for his role in the U.S. bishops' criticism of  Elizabeth Johnson, called one of the "most prominent and respected theologians" in the U.S. In a July 2011 letter to theologian John Thiel, then president of the Catholic Theological Society of America, Cardinal Timothy Dolan then USCCB president, said that the bishops' administrative committee had unanimously approved of the doctrine committee's statement regarding Johnson's book. Wuerl stated that he had offered to meet Johnson but she did not respond to his invitations. Wuerl was one of the cardinal electors who participated in the 2013 papal conclave that elected Pope Francis.

United States Conference of Catholic Bishops
Wuerl is said to have worked as a consensus builder on ideological conflicts over issues such as liturgical translation and communion for politicians favoring abortion rights in the 1990s and 2000s. Wuerl was as supporter of the Charter for the Protection of Children and Young People by the USCCB. The charter required that any clergyman who sexually abuses a child never again serve in ministry.

Public positions 
Thomas Reese, a Jesuit priest and journalist, said in 2006 that "[Wuerl is] quite orthodox theologically, but he doesn't like to play cop; he's not an authoritarian person." In 2018, Reese described him as an ideological moderate with regard to Catholic theological disputes, stating, "He's not an old leftie, he's not a right-wing culture warrior. ... He was totally enthusiastic about John Paul II, and then Pope Benedict, and now he's totally enthusiastic about Pope Francis. There are not many people in the church who are totally enthusiastic about all three of them." Journalist John Allen, Jr. said that Wuerl "was able to forge behind-the-scenes consensus because he was trusted by virtually all parties as someone who wouldn't embarrass them in public, and because he was seen as at least somewhat sympathetic to their points of view."

Religion and politics 
In cases where politicians and officeholders take policy positions that are at odds with church doctrine, Wuerl said the decision to offer communion should be made case-by-case: "Our primary job is to teach and try to convince people. The tradition in our country has not been in the direction of refusing Communion, and I think it's served us well."In 2009, the Council of the District of Columbia passed a same-sex marriage bill. In November 2009, Wuerl signed an ecumenical statement, known as the Manhattan Declaration, calling on evangelicals, Catholics, and Eastern Orthodox Christians not to comply with rules and laws permitting abortion, same-sex marriage, and other practices that go against their religious consciences.  In the debate on the D.C. same-sex marriage bill, the archdiocese of Washington advocated for so-called religious liberty provisions that it said would protect the church's ability to provide social services (e.g. adoption) in accordance with Catholic teaching on marriage.

After The Washington Post characterized the archdiocese as giving an "ultimatum" to the city and The New York Times called it a "threat", Wuerl wrote a letter to the Post stating there was "no threat or ultimatum to end services, just a simple recognition that the new requirements by the city for religious organizations to recognize same-sex marriages in their policies could restrict our ability to provide the same level of services as we do now." In December 2009, on the day of the bill's passage, Joe Solmonese, president of the Human Rights Campaign, a same-sex marriage advocacy organization, wrote that Wuerl had "refused to alter his official position" to reduce social services in the archdiocese. On the same day the archdiocese, though expressing its view that the bill did not adequately protect religious liberty, nonetheless affirmed its commitment to serving the needs of the poor and its hope for "working in partnership with the District of Columbia consistent with the mission of the Catholic Church."

In February 2010 shortly before the law took effect, Catholic Charities of the Archdiocese of Washington ended its foster care and public adoption programs rather than comply with the law's requirement that it license same-sex couples for the program. The agency also modified its employee health care benefits to avoid having to extend coverage to same-sex couples.

Response to Dominus Iesus 
In 2000, the Vatican issued a document entitled Dominus Iesus which stated that Jesus Christ is the only way of salvation. Wuerl said it was aimed at some theologians in Asia who are addressing Hinduism, Islam and Buddhism, and it defends the Catholic view of the necessity of proclaiming the Christian faith to them. The document acknowledges that there are elements in non-Christian scriptures "by which countless people throughout the centuries have been and still are able today to nourish and maintain their life-relationship with God."

Response to Summorum pontificum 
After Pope Benedict XVI issued the motu proprio Summorum Pontificum (2007) authorizing Latin Church priests to celebrate Mass using either the Roman Missal as revised in 1969 or the 1962 edition, Wuerl said that Pope Benedict was "trying to reach out pastorally to those who feel an attraction to this form of the liturgy, and he is asking the pastors to be aware of and support their interest". He added that about 500 people a week were attending celebrations of the Tridentine Mass at three places in his archdiocese. He sent a circular  to his priests about a special committee that he would establish "to assist pastors in evaluating and responding to requests for the regular and public celebration" of the 1962 form of Mass. As of 2017, the Tridentine Mass was reported on the archdiocesan website as celebrated weekly in three parishes, the same ones as in 2007.

Record on handling sex abuse cases 
Wuerl was originally widely considered to be a bishop who was proactive in confronting sexual abuse. Wuerl won plaudits and criticism for his efforts to remove sexually abusive clergy years before other church leaders made similar efforts. However, after the release of a grand jury investigation report in August 2018, he received a great deal of criticism for how he had handled some abuse cases.

1988 to 2018
In September 1988, when Wuerl was the bishop of Pittsburgh, he accepted a dinner invitation from a family suing the diocese for sexual abuse by a priest. Although the diocese's lawyers had discouraged Wuerl from attending the dinner, Wuerl became convinced that sexual abuse was a problem in his diocese. Wuerl settled the lawsuit with the family, and the priest involved was laicized and eventually ended up in prison. Wuerl told his staff that in cases of alleged sexual abuse, the first concern should be for the victim, the second concern should be for the victim's family, and only third should clergy consider the reputation of the Church.

In the years that followed, Wuerl investigated every priest in his diocese accused of sexual misconduct and removed several. On one occasion, Wuerl laicized a priest whom the Vatican initially had protected, Anthony Cipolla. Cipolla was ordained in 1972. In 1978, he was charged with sexual abuse of a 9-year-old boy; these charges were dropped by the mother, who said she was pressured to do so by Bishop Vincent Leonard. In 1988 new charges were brought by another man, who said that Cipolla abused him from around 1981 to 1986; this case was settled in 1993, over Cipolla's objections. Cipolla consistently said that he never abused anyone.

In 1988, Wuerl banned Cipolla from ministry and from identifying himself as a priest; Cipolla appealed to the Supreme Tribunal of the Apostolic Signatura, the Vatican's highest court, which ordered Wuerl to return him to ministry.  Wuerl asked the court to reconsider the case on the grounds that its decision showed a lack of awareness of crucial facts such as a civil lawsuit and Cipolla's 1978 arrest for sexually abusing another boy. The court reversed its ruling in 1995 and upheld Cipolla's ban. Cipolla nonetheless continued to minister to the public forcing the diocese to make several public statements that Cipolla was not in good standing. In 2002, Cipolla was laicized by the pope.

According to a Pittsburgh Post-Gazette article written in 2003, Wuerl had "a national reputation for zero tolerance of priests who molest minors" at the time.

In 2010, Wuerl argued that the church had made progress in confronting abusers. He told Fox News Sunday that "we have succeeded in guaranteeing that if a priest is accused, and there is a credible allegation, he is simply removed from the ministry. That is reported to the authorities, and we begin to try to heal whatever was damaged in that abuse."

2018 grand jury report

On August 14, 2018, a grand jury report released by Pennsylvania Attorney General Josh Shapiro alleged that the Catholic Church covered up sexual abuse cases. The report criticized how Wuerl had handled some cases during his tenure in Pittsburgh. Wuerl disputed the allegations, stating: "While I understand this report may be critical of some of my actions, I believe the report confirms that I acted with diligence, with concern for the victims and to prevent future acts of abuse." Shapiro disagreed with Wuerl's conclusions, saying, "Cardinal Wuerl is not telling the truth. Many of his statements in response to the Grand Jury Report are directly contradicted by the Church's own documents and records from their Secret Archives. Offering misleading statements now only furthers the cover up."The report said Wuerl made contributions to fighting sex abuse. This includes his successful effort, against resistance within the Vatican, between 1988 and 1995 to remove Anthony Cipolla for sexual abuse. However, Wuerl also allowed, based on the advice of multiple doctors, William O'Malley to return to active ministry in 1998, despite past allegations of abuse. O'Malley had admitted that he was sexually interested in adolescents. The report also stated that Wuerl had allowed Ernest Paone to be transferred to another diocese, despite a history of accusations of child abuse dating back to the early 1960s.

George Zirwas had a long history of involvement in child sexual abuse, sometimes including sadism. He had also manufactured child pornography. Zirwas' actions were known in the Diocese of Pittsburgh as early as 1987, but he continued in ministry when Wuerl became bishop of Pittsburgh in 1988. In 1989, Wuerl authorized a $900,000 settlement, with confidentiality clauses, with two of Zirwas' victims, but Zirwas remained in ministry despite further complaints. After another complaint was made, Wuerl removed Zirwas in 1996. Eventually Zirwas moved to Cuba, where he was murdered in 2001. Another case cited in the report involves Father Ernest Paone. The report alleges that Paone had a history of sexual abuse allegations against him and was frequently moved to different parishes across the United States, and that in 1991 Wuerl approved of him transferring to the Diocese of Reno-Las Vegas despite the diocese being aware of the reports surrounding his behavior. A new complaint arose against Paone in 1994. According to the report:"Wuerl responded by dispatching letters notifying the relevant California and Nevada Dioceses of the 1994 complaint. However, Wuerl did not report the more detailed information contained within Diocesan records. The Diocese did not recall Paone; nor did it suspend his faculties as a priest. To the contrary, Paone continued to have the support of the Diocese."

Reactions to report
After the Pennsylvania grand jury report was released, Wuerl launched a website, "The Wuerl Record," containing a defense of his record during that era. Wuerl insisted that in responding to sexual abuse claims, he had "acted with diligence, with concern for the victims and to prevent future acts of abuse." Wuerl further faced "intense scrutiny" regarding his handling of sex abuse cases in the Diocese of Pittsburgh. A spokesman for the Archdiocese of Washington said Wuerl "has no intention of resigning."

On August 20, 2018, Ave Maria Press announced that the release of a book written by Wuerl titled What Do You Want to Know? A Pastor's Response to the Most Challenging Questions About the Catholic Faith had been "indefinitely postponed." It had been scheduled for release in October 2018. On August 22, Pittsburgh Bishop David Zubik approved decisions by the boards of Cardinal Wuerl North Catholic High School and Catholic High Schools of the Diocese of Pittsburgh to grant Wuerl's request to remove his name from Cardinal Wuerl North Catholic High School. The school was to revert to its previous name, North Catholic High School. The decision was made after thousands petitioned for the change.

In response to the allegations against Wuerl, political commentator Hugh Hewitt demanded that Wuerl be dismissed as archbishop of Washington and resign from the College of Cardinals. In a few days time over 60,000 people signed a petition to Pope Francis to remove Wuerl. In what CNN called a "growing Catholic insurgency," Wuerl faced more calls for his resignation, including from a priest in his archdiocese and many laymen across ideological lines.

At the end of August, Wuerl flew to Rome, where he met with Pope Francis. The pope instructed Wuerl to confer with the priests of the archdiocese regarding his next steps. On September 3, Wuerl met with more than a hundred priests of the archdiocese. He told them he knew nothing about the allegations against McCarrick until they became public. Many priests offered their views; some encouraged Wuerl to resign while others encouraged him to "stay and be part of the church's healing process."

On September 8, Deacon James Garcia, the master of ceremonies at St. Matthew's Cathedral in Washington, informed Wuerl that he was refusing to serve Wuerl at Mass anymore, due to Wuerl's handling of sexual abuse cases, and asked him to resign. Garcia also denied that this refusal to serve with Wuerl violated his vow of obedience to Wuerl as his bishop.

Columnist Michael Sean Winters defended Wuerl's actions while bishop but said Wuerl's response to the report could hardly have been worse. Winters described the report as "spotty and inconsistent." Winters criticized the media response to the report and that it was weaponized by far-right groups such as Church Militant and LifeSiteNews in order to takedown Wuerl and attack Pope Francis.

Former New York Times reporter Peter Steinfels called the report "Grossly misleading, irresponsible, inaccurate, and unjust" noting that a third or more of the accusations were made know after the Dallas Charter and that such "inaccurate and incomplete" reports were used to push Wuerl out of office. Steinfels accused Shapiro of engineering the report in order to discredit church opposition.

Alleged sexual abuse by Theodore McCarrick

On August 25, 2018, Archbishop Carlo Maria Viganò, former papal nuncio to the United States, released an 11-page letter describing a series of warnings to the Vatican on sexual misconduct by Theodore McCarrick, Wuerl's predecessor as Archbishop of Washington, and subsequent alleged coverup by the Vatican and senior Church officials.  Viganò stated that he had discussed McCarrick's conduct and the penalties surrounding it with Wuerl and accused him of putting seminarians at risk by allowing McCarrick to reside at the Redemptoris Mater Archdiocesan Seminary after his retirement despite knowing that he was accused of abusing seminarians.

Through a spokesman, Wuerl denied that he was aware of McCarrick's misconduct prior to his removal from ministry, which took place on June 20, 2018. He also denied Viganò's claim that he knew of restrictions imposed on McCarrick by the Holy See. However, on January 10, 2019, The Washington Post published a story stating that Wuerl, despite his past denials, was aware of allegations against McCarrick in 2004 and reported them to the Vatican. Robert Ciolek, a former priest who reached a settlement in 2005 after accusing several Church officials including McCarrick of sexual misconduct, told the Post that he recently learned that the Diocese of Pittsburgh has a file that shows that Wuerl, who was Bishop of Pittsburgh at the time, was aware of his allegations against McCarrick and shared the information with then-Vatican ambassador Gabriel Montalvo Higuera. Both the Diocese of Pittsburgh and the Archdiocese of Washington subsequently acknowledged that Wuerl knew about and had reported Ciolek's allegation to the Vatican. The Archdiocese of Washington said that Wuerl did not intend to be "imprecise" in his earlier denials, and that they referred only to claims of abuse against minors, not adults. Days later, Wuerl himself apologized, stating that his earlier denials were the result of a "lapse of memory." Ciolek refused to believe that Wuerl forgot and did not accept his apology.
 	
On May 28, 2019, correspondence from McCarrick written in 2008 was published by Crux. In it, McCarrick refers to travel restrictions which were placed on him by Benedict XVI that same year after allegations of sexual misconduct. However, McCarrick gradually began to resume travelling. In a 2008 letter to Pietro Sambi, apostolic nuncio to the U.S., McCarrick wrote he had shared a Vatican letter explaining the restrictions with Wuerl, saying that his "help and understanding is, as always, a great help and fraternal support to me." However, a spokesperson for Wuerl denied that he had any knowledge of the sanctions.

Pittsburgh-area Lawsuits
On August 7, 2020, it was revealed that Wuerl was named as a defendant in a new sex abuse lawsuit which was filed in Allegheny County Common Pleas Court. The lawsuit claims that despite Wuerl's promise in 1994 that Rev. Leo Burchianti- who was accused of sexually abusing at least eight boys- would not receive a new church assignment, Wuerl and then-Father David Zubik gave him a voluntary work assignment at St. John Vianney Manor, a home for retired priests. Burchianti remained there from 1995 to 2012 and died in 2013. Wuerl has also been named as a defendant in other sex abuse lawsuits involving the Diocese of Pittsburgh as well.

Retirement as Archbishop of Washington

Wuerl submitted a letter of resignation in 2015, as is standard practice for any bishop who turns 75. On October 12, 2018, Pope Francis accepted Wuerl's resignation.
 
Wuerl planned to resign in September and meet with Pope Francis before doing so. This did not happen and the Pope accepted his resignation via a letter. The letter said that Wuerl had sent a new letter to the Pope requesting that he accept his resignation on September 21. Francis appointed him to serve as apostolic administrator of the Archdiocese of Washington, D.C., until his successor was appointed. Wuerl departed as apostolic administrator when Wilton Gregory was installed as Archbishop on May 21, 2019. Though he stepped down, Wuerl has continued to receive financial compensation from the Archdiocese of Washington. In 2020, over $2 million was designated for "continuing ministry activities for [the] Archbishop Emeritus."

Pope Francis praised Wuerl as a "model bishop" and his reply to the resignation offered this comment: "You have sufficient elements to justify your actions and distinguish between what it means to cover up crimes or not to deal with problems, and to commit some mistakes." A New York Times editorial criticized Pope Francis for the way he characterized Wuerl's resignation and handling of abuse cases. Pennsylvania Attorney General Josh Shapiro criticized the Pope's decision to allow Wuerl to resign without facing stronger consequences.

On October 12, Wuerl wrote to members of the archdiocese and said, "I am sorry and ask for healing for all of those who were so deeply wounded at the hands of the Church's ministers. I also beg forgiveness on behalf of Church leadership from the victims who were again wounded when they saw these priests and bishops both moved and promoted."

Selected writings 
 The Forty Martyrs: New Saints of England and Wales (Huntington: Our Sunday Visitor, 1971)
 Fathers of the Church (Huntington: Our Sunday Visitor, 1975)
 The Catholic Priesthood Today (Chicago: Franciscan Herald Press, 1976)
 The Teaching of Christ: A Catholic Catechism for Adults (Huntington: Our Sunday Visitor, 1976), co-author
 A Visit to the Vatican: For Young People (Boston: St. Paul Editions, 1981)
 The Gift of Faith: A Question and Answer Version of The Teaching of Christ (Huntington: Our Sunday Visitor, 2001)
 The Catholic Way: Faith for Living Today (New York: Doubleday, 2001)
 The Sacraments: A Continuing Encounter with Christ (Our Sunday Visitor, 2010)
 The Mass: The Glory, The Mystery, The Tradition (New York: Doubleday, 2011)
 The Gift of Blessed John Paul II (Frederick, MD: The Word Among Us Press, 2011)
 Seek First the Kingdom: Challenging the Culture by Living Our Faith (Huntington: Our Sunday Visitor, 2011)
 Faith That Transforms Us: Reflections on the Creed (Frederick, MD: The Word Among Us Press, 2013)
 New Evangelization: Passing on the Catholic Faith Today (Our Sunday Visitor, 2013)
 The Church: Unlocking the Secrets to the Places Catholics Call Home (Image, 2013)
 The Light is On For You: The Life-Changing Power of Confession (Frederick, MD: The Word Among Us Press, 2014)
 The Feasts: How the Church Year Forms Us as Catholics (Image: 2014)
 Open to the Holy Spirit: Living the Gospel with Wisdom (Our Sunday Visitor, 2014)
 The Marriage God Wants For You (Frederick, MD: The Word Among Us Press, 2015)
 To the Martyrs: A Reflection on the Supreme Christian Witness (Emmaus Road Publishing, 2015)
 Ways to Pray: Growing Closer to God (Our Sunday Visitor, 2015)

Pastoral letters as Archbishop of Washington 
 "Being Catholic Today: Catholic Identity in an Age of Challenge"  (So Católico Hoy: Identidad católica en una época de desafíos ), May 24, 2015 
 "Manifesting the Kingdom: A Pastoral Letter on the First Synod of the Archdiocese of Washington"  (La Manifestación del Reino ), June 8, 2014
 The Church, Our Spiritual Home  (La Iglesia, Nuestro Hogar Espiritual ), September 14, 2012
 "Disciples of the Lord: Sharing the Vision" , August 23, 2010
 "God's Mercy and Loving Presence"  (La Misericordia y la Amorosa Presencia de Dios ), January 3, 2010
 "Belonging to God's Family"  (Pertenciendo a la Familia de Dios ), January 25, 2009
 "Catholic Education: Looking to the Future with Confidence" , September 14, 2008
 "Reflections on God's Mercy And Our Forgiveness"  (Reflexiones sobre la Misericordia de Dios y el Perdón ), January 1, 2008
 "God's Mercy and the Sacrament of Penance"  (La Misericordia de Dios y el Sacramento de la Penitencia ), January 8, 2007

See also
 Catholic Church hierarchy
 Catholic Church in the United States
 Historical list of the Catholic bishops of the United States
 List of Catholic bishops of the United States
 Lists of patriarchs, archbishops, and bishops

References

Further reading

External links 

 
 Roman Catholic Archdiocese of Washington Official Site
 Roman Catholic Diocese of Pittsburgh History of Bishops webpage
 
 

 

1940 births
Living people
Catholic University of America alumni
Roman Catholic archbishops of Washington
Roman Catholic bishops of Pittsburgh
20th-century Roman Catholic bishops in the United States
21st-century American cardinals
American people of German descent
Pontifical University of Saint Thomas Aquinas alumni
Cardinals created by Pope Benedict XVI
Roman Catholic Archdiocese of Seattle
Pontifical North American College alumni
Pontifical Gregorian University alumni
Members of the Pontifical Council for Culture
Members of the Congregation for the Clergy
Members of the Congregation for the Doctrine of the Faith
Members of the Congregation for Bishops
Religious leaders from Washington (state)
Members of the Order of the Holy Sepulchre
Ecclesiastical passivity to Catholic sexual abuse cases
American expatriates in Italy
21st-century Roman Catholic archbishops in the United States